Western Lake is a census-designated place in Parker County, Texas, United States. This was a new CDP for the 2010 census with a population of 1,525.

Geography
Western Lake is located approximately 12 miles south of Weatherford is south central Parker County. It is part of the Dallas–Fort Worth metroplex.

Demographics
At the 2010 United States Census there were 1,525 people, 521 households, and 374 families residing in the CDP. The racial makeup of the CDP was 79.4% White (65.5% Non-Hispanic White), 0.6% African American, 0.6% Asian, 1.4% Native American, 15.3% from other races, and 2.8% from two or more races. Hispanic or Latino of any race were 30.4% of the population.

Education
The Weatherford Independent School District (WISD) serves students living in Western Lake. Zoned campuses include Curtis Elementary School (grades K-6), Hall Middle School (grades 7-8), Weatherford High School Ninth Grade Center (grade 9), and Weatherford High School  (grades 10-12).

References

Dallas–Fort Worth metroplex
Census-designated places in Texas
Census-designated places in Parker County, Texas